Events from the year 1673 in China.

Incumbents 
 Kangxi Emperor (12th year)

Events 
  Prince of Pingnan Shang Kexi, ill and of old age, inquires if he might be allowed to retire from his fiefdom and retire back to Manchuria
 Kangxi leaped at the chance and graciously gave his permission
 December — The Revolt of the Three Feudatories broke out in 1673 when Wu Sangui's forces, based in his fiefdom in Yunnan, overran most of southwest China and he tried to ally himself with local generals such as Wang Fuchen. He declares his intent to restore the Ming dynasty
  1673, Wu's forces captured Hunan and Sichuan provinces
 Wu Sangui ends his connection to the Qing dynasty and declares the Zhou dynasty. An Emperor is not named, implying that an heir to the Ming dynasty will become emperor.
 Sino-Russian border conflicts

Deaths
 Zhu Guozhi, Governor of Yunnan

References

 
 .

 
China